Eretmocera medinella is a moth of the family Scythrididae. It was described by Otto Staudinger in 1859. It is found in Spain, Sardinia, Russia and Turkey (Erzurum and Igdir Provinces).

The wingspan is 10–12 mm.

The larvae feed on Suaeda species.

References

medinella
Moths described in 1859